Psilocybe caerulescens, also known as landslide mushroom  ("derrumbe" in Spanish), is a  psilocybin mushroom having psilocybin and psilocin as main active compounds. Along with Psilocybe mexicana and Psilocybe aztecorum, it is one of the mushrooms likely to have been used by the Aztecs and is currently used by Mazatec shamans for its entheogenic properties.

Description 
The taste and smell of Psilocybe caerulescens are strongly farinaceous, reminiscent of cucumber, though the smell lessens with age or when dry.

Cap 
The cap is (1)3–7(10) cm broad. Convex to obtusely campanulate with an incurved margin at first, rarely becoming plane, and often are umbonate or with a slight depression in the center. It is viscid when moist from a separable gelatinous pellicle. The margin is slightly translucent-striate when moist. The cap is hygrophanous, yellowish brown to reddish brown with a silvery-blue metallic luster, paler at the margin, and drying to a beige or straw yellow. It readily bruises blue when handled, the younger specimens bruising bluish olivaceous or even blackish. The cap often has a great variation in color and form.

Gills 
The gills are adnate to sinuate and close to subclose. They are whitish, yellowish grey when young, becoming dark violaceous brown to sepia brown with age; the edges remain slightly whitish.
Psilocybe caerulescens spores are dark violaceous brown.

Stipe 
The stipe is (2)5–9(13) cm long and (5)8–10(12) mm thick. It is equal or enlarging slightly at the base, and is somewhat flexuous, hollow, and subpruinose to floccose. The stipe is whitish to reddish brown or blackish and readily bruises blue. Rhizomorphs are sometimes attached to the base. The veil is well-developed but does not form a permanent annulus.

Microscopic features 
The spores are hexagonal to subrhomboid in frontal view and ellipsoid in side view, (5.6)6.7–8(9) x (4) 4.8–6.4 (7.2) x 4–4.8 (5.5) μm. The basidia each produce four spores, and occasionally only two larger spores. The cheilocystidia are 16–27(29) x 4.5–8 μm and lageniform to narrowly lageniform, with a flexuous neck that is 1–2.5 μm broad and sometimes bifurcate. Basidia 18.5–22.5 × 5.5–6.5 μm, cylindrical, four spored, hyaline and thin-walled. Pleurocystidia 12–20 (–32) × 4.5–9 (‒10) μm, fusiform, occasionally conical, clavate or utriform, occasionally bifurcate, hyaline, thin-walled. The subhymenium is ramose-inflated. Pileus trama is radial, with hyphae 5–32 μm, yellowish to yellowish brown, thick walled (0.5–1 μm). Pileipellis an ixocutis, (9–) 12–54 μm wide, hyphae 1.5–4 (–5.5) μm diameter, hyaline and thin-walled. Pileocystidia (10–) 12–28 × 4–9.5 μm, globose, cylindrical, clavate, flexuose or pyriform and thin-walled. Stipitipellis a cutis, hyphae 1.5–9.5 μm diameter, yellowish brown, thin-walled (up to 0.5–0.8 μm thick). Caulocystidia (19–) 22.5–49.5 (–56) × 4–8 (–9.5) μm, cylindrical, lageniform, fusiform or, utriform, or lageniform, hyaline and, thin-walled.

Habitat and formation 
Psilocybe caerulescens is found growing gregariously or cespitosely, rarely solitarily, from June through October on disturbed  ground often devoid of herbaceous plants. It often grows in sunny locations, preferring muddy orangish brown soils with much woody debris. Psilocybe caerulescens was first reported from near Montgomery, Alabama, by Murrill in 1923 on sugarcane mulch, not re-documented from that locality since. It was recently found in South Carolina in September 2008. Psilocybe caerulescens is common and widespread throughout northern Georgia.  Found in N. Georgia in 2000.

See also 
 List of Psilocybin mushrooms

References

Entheogens
Psychoactive fungi
caerulescens
Psychedelic tryptamine carriers
Fungi of North America
Fungi of South America
Taxa named by William Alphonso Murrill